Knoda is a mountain in southern Norway. The mountains Kistenuten, Vassdalseggi, and Trollaskeinuten all lie to the southeast of Knoda.

See also
List of mountains of Norway

References

Mountains of Vestland
Mountains of Rogaland
Suldal
Ullensvang